Fabiana Santos (born  in Santo André) is a Brazilian bobsledder.

Santos competed at the 2014 Winter Olympics for Brazil. She teamed with Sally Mayara da Silva in the two-woman event, finishing 19th.

Santos made her World Cup debut in February 2005. As of April 2014, her best World Cup finish is 15th, at Lake Placid in 2004-05.

References

1983 births
Living people
Brazilian female bobsledders
Olympic bobsledders of Brazil
People from Santo André, São Paulo
Bobsledders at the 2014 Winter Olympics
Sportspeople from São Paulo (state)